The Hairy Bikers: Route 66 is a UK food lifestyle programme which was broadcast on BBC 2 in 2019. In each one-hour episode, The Hairy Bikers travel along the iconic Route 66 Highway, taking in the culture and history as well as trying local dishes.

Episodes

Home media
Hairy Bikers Ride Route 66 was released on DVD on 2 December 2019.

References

External links
Recipes from the series

Hairy Bikers on the BBC

Motorcycle television series